Hassan El Fakiri (born 18 April 1977) is a Norwegian former professional footballer, and the current head coach of 3. divisjon club Os TF.

Career
Born in Amezzaourou, a town in the commune of Temsamane, Morocco, El Fakiri started his career with the Norwegian, Oslo-based club Lyn. He made his debut in game against local rivals Skeid on 28 May 1995. As a young and talented midfielder, El Fakiri earned the admiration of the Lyn fans, who made him player of the year in 1997.

El Fakiri joined SK Brann in 2000, instantly catching the eyes of scouts from the French-registered, Monaco based football club, AS Monaco FC. Due to SK Brann's dire financial straits at the time, El Fakiri was sold to the French Ligue 1 team before he had actually played a league game for SK Brann. El Fakiri played nine league games for SK Brann, scoring three goals, before leaving Bergen in the transfer window. One of the most notable contributions from El Fakiri was a sterling performance in midfield in the first game of the 2000 Tippeliga season, a 4–1 home drubbing of local rivals Viking FK. Two of the goals in this game was scored by the striker Mons Ivar Mjelde, who later re-signed El Fakiri, this time as the manager of SK Brann.

El Fakiri's stay in Monaco started off slowly, being sent out on loan to both his boyhood Norwegian team Lyn and Rosenborg BK. The 2002–03 French League 1 season saw El Fakiri's fortunes change, with AS Monaco coach Didier Deschamps' preferring to use the midfielder as a right back. El Fakiri was an unused substitute in the 2004 Champions League final between Monaco and Portuguese side FC Porto.

El Fakiri's contract with Monaco expired in 2005, and he chose to continue his career with Borussia Mönchengladbach, joining the Bundesliga side on a Bosman free transfer. At Borussia, he returned to his favoured midfield berth, helping the side to tenth place in the 2005–06 Bundesliga. However, the next season Borussia were relegated from the Bundesliga after losing 1–0 at home to VfB Stuttgart on the last matchday.

The relegation coincided with El Fakiri's contract expiring, and after considering several contract proposals from Norwegian clubs, he returned to Brann seven years after he left Brann for Monaco. His return to Bergen was a happy one, helping SK Brann to their first Norwegian championship in 44 years.

International career
El Fakiri was capped eight times by the Norway national football team.

Career statistics
Source:

Honours
Monaco
Coupe de la Ligue: 2002–03
UEFA Champions League: Runner-up 2003–04

Brann
 Norwegian Premier League: 2007

References

 

1977 births
Living people
Moroccan emigrants to Norway
Naturalised citizens of Norway
Norwegian people of Moroccan descent
Footballers from Oslo
Norwegian footballers
Norway international footballers
Association football midfielders
Lyn Fotball players
SK Brann players
AS Monaco FC players
Rosenborg BK players
Borussia Mönchengladbach players
Eliteserien players
Ligue 1 players
Bundesliga players
Norwegian expatriate footballers
Expatriate footballers in France
Norwegian expatriate sportspeople in France
Expatriate footballers in Germany
Norwegian expatriate sportspeople in Germany
Norwegian expatriate sportspeople in Monaco
Expatriate footballers in Monaco